"I Love You by Heart" is a song written by Jerry Gillespie and Stan Webb, and recorded by American country music artists Sylvia and Michael Johnson.  It was released in November 1985 as the third single from the album One Step Closer.  The song reached #9 on the Billboard Hot Country Singles & Tracks chart.

The song was Sylvia's last top 10 hit on the Hot Country Singles chart, and the first for Johnson, who had enjoyed success in mainstream pop music in the late 1970s and early 1980s, charting several songs that reached the top 20 of the Billboard Hot 100 chart. While Sylvia had only one other top 40 country hit, Johnson went on to be a consistent hitmaker for the next few years, reaching No. 1 in 1987 with "Give Me Wings" and "The Moon Is Still Over Her Shoulder."

Chart performance

References

1985 songs
1985 singles
Sylvia (singer) songs
Michael Johnson (singer) songs
Songs written by Jerry Gillespie
RCA Records Nashville singles
Song recordings produced by Brent Maher
Male–female vocal duets